Rubellia is a genus of grasshoppers described by Carl Stål in 1875, in the tribe Sphenariini and monotypic subtribe Rubelliina.  It appears to be monotypic, containing Rubellia nigrosignata (Stål, 1875). It is endemic to the island of Madagascar.

References

Caelifera genera
Pyrgomorphidae